Aaron L. Dixon (born January 2, 1949) is an American activist and a former captain of the Seattle chapter of the Black Panther Party for its initial four years. In 2006, he ran for the United States Senate in Washington state on the Green Party ticket.

Background
As an adolescent, Dixon marched with Dr. Martin Luther King Jr. to end housing discrimination in Seattle, and was one of the first volunteers to participate in the busing program to integrate schools. King's assassination, on April 4, 1968, deeply affected Dixon and propelled him towards the Black Power Movement. That week, Dixon and his brother Elmer were in San Francisco for the West Coast Black Student Union conference, and during that time attended the funeral of Bobby Hutton, a member of the Black Panther Party killed on April 6 in a confrontation with the police. Following the funeral, Dixon met with some of the Black Panther leadership such as Bobby Seale and Kathleen Cleaver, who made a vivid impression upon him. The time spent in San Francisco lead the Dixon brothers to set up the first Black Panther chapter outside of California, in Seattle.

While a member of the Black Panthers, Dixon started the Free Breakfast for Children program that fed thousands of hungry African American children; and he helped to open a free community medical and legal clinic. The clinic continues to this day as the Carolyn Downs Family Medical Center. At the same time, according to the Seattle Weekly, the Panthers were involved in the "firebombing [of] businesses and institutions that they considered racist."

Dixon also became involved in electoral politics when he worked on the mayoral campaign of Lionel Wilson, who was elected as the first black mayor of Oakland, California in 1977.

After leaving the Panthers, Dixon worked for several non-profit organizations, focusing on drug and gang violence and working with homeless youth. In 2002, he founded Central House, a non-profit providing transitional housing for homeless young adults. Central House also has a Youth Leadership Project that operates at four Seattle public high schools. It teaches youth to think positively, graduate high school, and control their own destinies. It also teaches them the importance of serving their community.

Dixon is the father of six and lives in Albuquerque, New Mexico.

2006 United States Senate race

On March 9, 2006, Dixon announced his decision to seek the Green Party's nomination for U.S. Senate, challenging incumbent Maria Cantwell on her continued support for the U.S. presence in Iraq and the USA PATRIOT Act.

His platform included a call for immediate withdrawal from Iraq, the repeal of the PATRIOT Act, support of same-sex marriage, the implementation of a system of universal single-payer health care, the end the war on drugs and a renewed focus on the issue of poverty.

On May 13, 2006, Dixon was nominated as the Green Party of Washington State's nominee for the U.S. Senate. On July 10, 2006, the Secretary of State's office announced that the Dixon campaign had gathered the appropriate nomination signatures and that Aaron Dixon would appear on the November ballot. Besides Dixon and Cantwell, the ballot included Libertarian nominee Bruce Guthrie, independent candidate Robin Adair and Republican challenger Mike McGavick.

Endorsements and criticisms
A positive reaction to Dixon's candidacy came from Republican Chairwoman Diane Tebelius. Negative reactions from other Democrats, who cited the vote splitting that Dixon would have on Cantwell's voters, thus aiding the pro-Iraq War Republican candidate.

Dixon faced criticism for having criminal charges on his record, most for traffic violations, and owing the city and county substantial fines as a result. Public records revealed that Dixon: had only ever voted once in King County, in 1998; was not married to his claimed wife, and was still married to a different woman; and owed several thousand dollars to another former spouse for child support payments. Dixon described these as additional costs in addition to his agreed payments, and indicated he was working to pay the debt.

October 17 debate exclusion and arrest

Dixon did not meet the sponsors' criteria of public support or fundraising to participate in a televised debate of the Senate candidates to be held on October 17, 2006, sponsored by various news outlets and civic organizations in King County; to take part, candidates had to have garnered 10 percent of the tally in a scientific poll; be the nominated candidate of a party that won 10 percent of the vote in the last election; or have raised at least $1.2 million.

On the day of the debate, Dixon was arrested for trespassing at the KING-TV studio in Seattle, where he and his supporters were protesting his exclusion from the debate being taped there for broadcast later that day.

Election results

Maria Cantwell (D) 1,184,659 - 56.81%
Mike McGavick (R) 832,106 - 39.91%
Bruce Guthrie (L)  29,331 - 1.41%
Aaron Dixon (G) 21,254 - 1.02%
Robin Adair (I) 16,384 votes - 0.79%
Write-ins (NP) 1,445 votes - 0.07%

Post-campaign

In the months following the campaign, Dixon reorganized much of the campaign's organization into the Center for Social Justice, based out of the campaign's former headquarters in Seattle's Central district. The Center organized an anti-war rally and march on January 27, 2007, in Seattle, which had a turnout of several thousand.

In 2012, Dixon published a memoir, My People Are Rising: Memoir of a Black Panther Party Captain.

References

External links 

Interview with Aaron Dixon 2005, and transcript of 1970 interview. Seattle Civil Rights and Labor History Project
Campaign Website
Aaron Dixon's Myspace Page
Aaron Dixon press conference video
KUOW Speaker's Forum: Aaron Dixon on the History of the Black Panther Party
KUOW - The Conversation with Ross Reynolds: Aaron Dixon on his 2006 candidacy for U.S. Senate
"Former Black Panther Aaron Dixon to run for Senate" - Seattle Post-Intelligencer, March 8, 2006 
"Former Panther Leader Runs Against Cantwell" - Seattle Times, March 9, 2006 
"Educating Senator Cantwell" - Eat the State, March 16, 2006  
Seattle Civil Rights and Labor History Project: Interview with Aaron Dixon 
"Lending a Hand to Hard-luck Kids" — Seattle Times, November 19, 2003 - profile of Harder House, founded by Aaron Dixon
"Reunion of Black Panthers" - Seattle Times, June 1, 2005 
"California, Washington and New York Green Party Candidates Join "March for Love and Life", Green Party of the United States Press Release, June 23, 2006 
"Anti-war liberals blast Cantwell", Seattle Post-Intelligencer, August 10, 2006 
  "Out of War...And Into Our Communities", By Jesse Hagopian, October 4th, 2006 
"We Have a Choice: a grassroots run for senate (2006)", a film at archive.org 

1949 births
People from Chicago
Activists from Seattle
American community activists
Living people
Members of the Black Panther Party
Washington (state) Greens
American anti-war activists
African-American people in Washington (state) politics
American democracy activists
Activists from Illinois